is the Japanese craft of making cloth from the  or Japanese fibre banana as practiced in Kijōka in Ogimi, Okinawa. Like linen, hemp, ramie and other long vegetable fibres, it does not stick to the skin in hot weather; as such it is suitable for the climate of Okinawa.  is recognized as one of the Important Intangible Cultural Properties of Japan.

History
 formed part of the tribute to Ming dynasty China, while 3,000 rolls were listed as due after the Satsuma invasion of Okinawa in 1609. Production increased in the Meiji period with the introduction of the  loom. After the Battle of Okinawa, production declined dramatically. Formerly made across the Ryūkyū islands,  production is now localized to Kijōka.

Modern production
 trees are stripped and, after sterilization, softened bast fibres are extracted and spun into weavable yarn; these are then woven to produce cloth that is lightweight, strong, and smooth to the touch. Approximately forty trees are required to make a standard roll of fabric. The colour of the  fibre forms the background; patterns are woven in indigo and brown.

Cultural heritage
In 2000, practitioner of  production  (1921–2022) was recognized as a Living National Treasure.

See also
Important Intangible Cultural Properties of Japan
National Treasures of Japan - Dyeing and weaving
Representative List of the Intangible Cultural Heritage of Humanity

References

Further reading

Textile-related meibutsu
Bananas in culture
Clothing by material
Japanese words and phrases
Ryukyuan culture
Important Intangible Cultural Properties of Japan